Fady Elchab is a former professional rugby league footballer who represented Lebanon in the 2000 World Cup.

Playing career
Elchab played in a trial match for Lebanon on 26 August 2000, against the South Sydney Rabbitohs.

He played in one World Cup match, starting at five-eighth against Wales on 2 November 2000.

References

Lebanon national rugby league team players
Rugby league five-eighths
Living people
Year of birth missing (living people)